The 1992 season was the first season in the top Ukrainian football league for Dynamo Kyiv. Dynamo competed in Vyshcha Liha, and Ukrainian Cup.

Players

Squad information

Transfers

In

Out

Pre-season and friendlies

Competitions

Overall

Premier League

League table

Results summary

Results by round

Matches

Notes:

Ukrainian Cup

Soviet Cup

At least three Ukrainian clubs qualified for the rounds that were conducted following the official dissolution of the Soviet Union. All of them withdrew the competition, including FC Dynamo Kyiv.

European Cup

FC Dynamo Kyiv initially represented the Soviet Union (ephemeral CIS), later its records were adopted by Russia as the Soviet's only successor.

Group table

Matches

References

External links
 "Динамо" Київ - 1992. ukr-footbal.org.ua
 Состав Динамо Киев в сезоне 1992. www.allplayers.in.ua
 "Динамо" Київ - 1992. www.uafootball.net.ua

Dynamo Kyiv
FC Dynamo Kyiv seasons